Pasaje Del Terror is an interactive walk-through horror attraction with branches in thirty different cities in Spain, including Madrid, Barcelona, Bilbao, Seville, Málaga, Salou, Santander, etc. as well as some of the major cities of the world, such as Rome, Lisbon, Blackpool, Buenos Aires, Bariloche, Cancun, San Salvador and Tokyo. Although it has generally preserved its name internationally, a now-defunct variant of the attraction, Terror on Church Street, launched in Orlando, Florida in 1991.

Special effects
The attraction prides itself with rich special effects and artistic designs. The attraction works on the 'what you can't see will scare you' tactic. Actors use the dark to intense advantage, springing up when the group least expects it. Special rooms and passageways are designed to transfigure or disappear in an attempt to confuse the group. Candles flicker persistently, sometimes drowning out any light. A soundtrack is present throughout. Claustrophobia also plays a great part in special effects. Rooms spin, passageways tighten, wooden bridges shake over an undergrowth and doors seem to lock of their own accord.

Restrictions
It is advised that young children, those of a nervous disposition, and those who suffer from epilepsy should not experience the attraction. The attraction is not recommended for expectant mothers.

References

 CoasterKingdom review
 Master Production Entertainment creators of the Pasaje del Terror

External links
Rites of Pasaje An article from themagiceye at Joyland about the development of Pasaje Del Terror.
PasajeDelTerror.com Official website.